The Little Rock Central High School Desegregation silver dollar is a commemorative coin issued by the United States Mint in 2007. The coin commemorates the desegregation of the school in the fall of 1957 when nine African-American students enrolled in the school. The obverse of the coin was designed by Richard Masters and sculpted by Charles L. Vickers, while the reverse was designed and engraved by Don Everhart. The coin won the Coin of the Year award from Numismatic News for Best Contemporary Event in 2009.

See also

 List of United States commemorative coins and medals (2000s)
 United States commemorative coins

References

2007 establishments in the United States
Modern United States commemorative coins
United States dollar coins
United States silver coins